Edgar Gonzalez, Jr. is a Democratic member of the Illinois House of Representatives for the 23rd District. The 23rd District includes all or parts of the Chicago neighborhoods of South Lawndale, Brighton Park, and North Lawndale along with the nearby suburb of Cicero.

Early life and education 
Edgar Gonzalez Jr. was born and raised in the Little Village neighborhood of Chicago, Illinois, two blocks away from Cook County Jail. A son of working-class immigrants from Monterrey, Nuevo León, Mexico, his father is currently an IUOE Local 399 union member, his mother was formerly an SEIU Local 73 union member, and his sister is a current student at Columbia University.

He attended John Spry Elementary School for preschool and Maria Saucedo Scholastic Academy from kindergarten to sixth grade. He enrolled in Whitney M. Young Magnet High School's Academic Center and graduated in 2015. He went on to Harvard University, where he earned a bachelor's degree in government with a minor in economics in 2019, becoming the first in his family to graduate from college. During his time at Harvard, Gonzalez was a political cartoonist for The Harvard Crimson and a staff writer for the Harvard Political Review, as well as a tutor and translator for Harvard Student Agencies. He volunteered his time as a tutor for recent immigrant arrivals in English and subject tutoring at Chelsea High School and Malden High School, and launched a tutoring and mentoring program for at-risk Latinx youth in the Boston area with Roxbury nonprofit Sociedad Latina. On his breaks from school, he interned with Enlace Chicago his freshman summer, the MacArthur Foundation his sophomore summer, and with 22nd Ward Democratic Committeeman Michael Rodriguez (politician) his junior summer.

Upon graduation, Gonzalez began working as a constituency services liaison for Congressman Jesús "Chuy" García, specializing in casework and outreach ranging from immigration, social security, and veterans to criminal justice and education.

Political career 

Gonzalez was appointed to the Illinois House of Representatives on January 10, 2020, to replace Celina Villanueva, who in turn had been appointed to fill the vacancy of State Senator Martin Sandoval of Illinois's 11th State Senate District. The appointment was conducted by a panel of local Democratic leaders. At the time of his inauguration, Gonzalez was the youngest state representative in Illinois at 23 years of age. He is the youngest Latino state representative and the youngest Democratic state representative to be inaugurated in Illinois's history.

Gonzalez was the first member of the Illinois House of Representatives to publicly state he had tested positive for COVID-19 in May 2020.

As of July 3, 2022, Representative Gonzalez is a member of the following Illinois House committees:

 Cybersecurity, Data Analytics, & IT Committee (HCDA)
 Ethics & Elections Committee (SHEE)
 Higher Education Committee (HHED)
 Housing Committee (SHOU)
 Judiciary - Criminal Committee (HJUC)
 Small Business, Tech Innovation, and Entrepreneurship Committee (SBTE)

Electoral history

References

External links
Representative Edgar Gonzalez Jr. (D) at the Illinois General Assembly
Campaign website

1996 births
Living people
Democratic Party members of the Illinois House of Representatives
Harvard College alumni
Whitney M. Young Magnet High School alumni
21st-century American politicians
Hispanic and Latino American state legislators in Illinois
Politicians from Chicago
Mexican-American people in Illinois politics